Tadesse Wolde-Medhin (born 2 October 1936) is an Ethiopian long-distance runner. He competed in the men's 10,000 metres at the 1972 Summer Olympics.

References

External links
 

1936 births
Living people
Athletes (track and field) at the 1968 Summer Olympics
Athletes (track and field) at the 1972 Summer Olympics
Ethiopian male long-distance runners
Ethiopian male steeplechase runners
Olympic athletes of Ethiopia
Place of birth missing (living people)
20th-century Ethiopian people
21st-century Ethiopian people